Envoi Allen (foaled 16 February 2014) is a French-bred thoroughbred racehorse competing in National Hunt racing.

Career
Envoi Allen was bred in France and first raced in Ireland in a point to point at Ballinaboola where he won by 10 lengths.

He was sold at the Tattersalls Ireland Cheltenham February Sale for £400,000.  Bloodstock agent Tom Malone purchased the horse on behalf of David and Patricia Thompson of Cheveley Park Stud.

Trained by Gordon Elliott in Ireland, Envoi Allen won his first 11 races under rules. This included victories at the Cheltenham Festival in two Grade 1s, winning the 2019 Champion Bumper and 2020 Ballymore Novices Hurdle.

In Ireland he won three Grade 1 races the 2019 Royal Bond Novice Hurdle, Lawlors of Naas Novice Hurdle and the Drinmore Novice Chase.

In March 2021, training was switched from Gordon Elliott to Henry De Bromhead.

De Bromhead's training of Envoi Allen got off to a poor start as he fell in the Marsh Chase at Cheltenham  and was pulled up in the Dooley Insurance Champion Novice Chase at Punchestown. It was later revealed he had suffered an injury early in the race.

After the summer break, he returned at Down Royal to victory in a Grade 2 Chase.  He also won a Grade 1 at Leopardstown ridden by Grand National and Gold Cup winning jockey Rachael Blackmore.

References

External links
  – Envoi Allen Race Form

2014 racehorse births
Cheltenham Festival winners
Racehorses trained in Ireland
National Hunt racehorses
Racehorses bred in France